Staying Alive or Stayin' Alive may refer to:

Music
 "Stayin' Alive", a 1977 song by Bee Gees from the Saturday Night Fever soundtrack
 Stayin' Alive (J-Flexx album), 2007
 Stayin' Alive (Jackyl album), 1998
 "Staying Alive" (song), a song by DJ Khaled featuring Drake and Lil Baby, 2022
 "Staying Alive", a song by Nina from the album Stay Alive, 2011
 "Staying Alive", a song by Cursive from The Ugly Organ, 2003
 "Stayin' Alive", a 2013 song by Capital Cities from Stayin' Alive

Film and television
 Staying Alive (1983 film), the sequel to Saturday Night Fever, named after the Bee Gees song
 Staying Alive (2012 film), an Indian film
 Staying Alive (2015 film), a Norwegian film by Maipo Film
 Staying Alive (TV series), a 1996–1997 British television medical drama series
 "Stayin' Alive", a 2000 episode of animated series Happy Tree Friends

Other
 MTV Staying Alive, an AIDS-awareness campaign initiative

See also
 Stay Alive (disambiguation)
 Staying a Life, a 1990 album by Accept